The Confirmation is a 2016 Canadian drama film starring Clive Owen, Jaeden Martell, and Maria Bello. Written and directed by Bob Nelson, who also produced it with Todd Hoffman, the film concerns a young boy (Martell), who tries to reconnect with his divorced father (Owen). The film also co-stars Robert Forster, Tim Blake Nelson, Patton Oswalt, and Matthew Modine. It marked the first time Nelson had ever directed a film. The Confirmation received a limited release in selected theaters in the United States and on iTunes on March 18, 2016.

Plot
Walt, a divorced father and his eight-year-old son, Anthony, are about to spend a somewhat predictable weekend together, nevertheless, when a valuable toolbox gets stolen, the search for the thieves will soon turn into a true family bonding.

Cast
Clive Owen as Walt
Jaeden Martell as Anthony
Maria Bello as Bonnie
Robert Forster as Otto
Tim Blake Nelson as Vaughn
Patton Oswalt as Drake
Matthew Modine as Kyle
Stephen Tobolowsky as Father Lyons
Spencer Drever as Allen
Michael Eklund as Tucker
Ryan Robbins as Trout
Garry Chalk as Pete
Jennifer Copping as Roger's Wife
Patrick Gilmore as Roger
Catherine Lough Haggquist as Officer Sue
Luvia Petersen as Bartender Nancy
Eliza Faria as Linda

Production
Screenwriter Bob Nelson, who had previously worked on penning the screenplay for Nebraska (2013) directed by Alexander Payne, first mentioned the project in an interview with Wall Street Journal in February 2014, where he stated that he had completed the screenplay for the film. Principal photography commenced on November 11, 2014 in Vancouver, British Columbia.

On November 18, 2014, it was announced that Clive Owen, Jaeden Lieberher and Maria Bello were cast in the film, along with Robert Forster, Tim Blake Nelson, Patton Oswalt and Matthew Modine. In September 2015, studio company Saban Films revealed that they had secured the distribution rights for a North American release.

Screenplay
Nelson says "I thought it would be funny if you took a boy who was really good and doesn't really sin and have him break pretty much every commandment in a day. That kind of gave me a basis to start, too, when I was filling out the notebook."

The scene where Anthony keeps his father from getting alcohol is based on Bob Nelson's own experience.

The story outline is based on the Italian classic Bicycle Thieves by Vittorio de Sica.

Release
The Confirmation premiered on March 18, 2016 as a limited release in selected theaters in the United States and on iTunes.

Reception
On review aggregator Rotten Tomatoes, the film has an approval rating of 91% based on 32 reviews, with an average rating of 6.7/10. On Metacritic, the film holds a score of 65 out of 100, based on 11 critics, indicating "generally favorable reviews".

References

External links

2016 films
English-language Canadian films
2016 comedy-drama films
Canadian comedy-drama films
Canadian independent films
Saban Films films
Films shot in Vancouver
2016 directorial debut films
Films about father–son relationships
2010s English-language films
2010s Canadian films